Veit Hanns Friedrich Schnorr von Carolsfeld (11 May 1764 – 30 April 1841) was a German portraitist.

Life
Schnorr was born in Schneeberg. He was a friend of the poet Johann Gottfried Seume, whom he set out to accompany in 1801 on a journey to Syracuse, Sicily, but separated from him after travelling no further than Vienna.

In 1803 he returned to Leipzig and became an assistant teacher at the Leipzig Academy of Art. In 1814, after the death of Johann Friedrich August Tischbein, he became director, which he remained until 1841.

Schnorr was a significant portraitist. His works include, among many others, portraits of Seume and Friedrich Rochlitz.

Family 
Two of his sons also became prominent painters:
 Julius Schnorr von Carolsfeld and
 Ludwig Ferdinand Schnorr von Carolsfeld

Works 
 Briefe über Zeichenkunst und Malerei, in: Zweites Toilettengeschenk für Damen, Leipzig 1806
 Unterricht in der Zeichenkunst als ein Gegenstand der seineren Erziehung zur Bildung des Geschmacks für die höheren Stände, Leipzig 1810
 Anmerkungen und Zusätze zur 3. Auflage des Spazierganges nach Syrakus (in the third part of Seume's book, published in 1811)
 Meine Lebensgeschichte, zugleich als ein Sonst und Jetzt in einem Zeitraum von 55 Jahren, ed. Otto Werner Förster, Leipzig: Taurus Verlag, 2000

Literature

External links 

 Leipzig-Lexikon: Veit Hanns Friedrich Schnorr von Carolsfeld 

18th-century German painters
18th-century German male artists
German male painters
1764 births
1841 deaths
Academic staff of the Hochschule für Grafik und Buchkunst Leipzig
People from Schneeberg, Saxony
19th-century German painters
19th-century German male artists